Obrium rufulum is a species of beetle in the family Cerambycidae. It was described by Gahan in 1908.

References

Obriini
Beetles described in 1908